Angela Patton is a female activist and activator for "at-risk", or, as she prefers "at-promise", African-American girls. She is the founder of Camp Diva, and the CEO of Girls For A Change (GFAC) in 2012. As the CEO of GFAC, Patton works diligently to support and empower young girls of color to feel seen, heard, and celebrated as they enter into womanhood. Through before and after school programs and summer camps, GFAC teaches these young colored females, ages 6–14, key skills in order for them to have a bright future. GFAC works to better the neighborhoods and cities surrounding Richmond, Virginia by creating and demonstrating social change.

In 2012, Patton gained national attention when she gave her speech, "A father-daughter dance...in prison" at the TEDxWomen conference. Her speech explained how Camp Diva started a father-daughter dance for girls who have fathers in prison and the impact the dance had on their relationship and the Richmond community. This emotional and inspirational speech was watched by over 800,000 people. Patton has received honors and awards at the local, state, and national level due to her work within the organization.

Education  
Patton studied and completed her Business Administration degree at ECPI University. At Virginia Commonwealth University, she received her certification in Non-profit Management. This certificate allowed her to develop the skills and knowledge needed to create and develop her own non-profit organizations, such as Camp Diva and Spa Travelers, a group for Richmond women struggling with the effects of poverty, domestic violence, and single motherhood.

Work 
Patton spent time working with other non-profit organizations surrounding the Richmond, VA area, such as the YMCA, the Children's Museum of Richmond, and the Richmond AIDS Ministry. Patton is also a licensed nurse and doula, who supported new mothers and those living with AIDS. Patton serves on the board of the East District Family Resource Center, which extended a helping hand to East End citizens by providing emergency assistance programs, education initiatives, and career development programs.  All together, Patton has spent over 20 years working in the non-profit sector to support and empower marginalized individuals in the United States.

Camp Diva 
Camp Diva was founded in 2004 to honor and remember Diva Mstadi Smith-Roan, a five-year-old African-American girl who died in a firearm accident earlier that year. Patton worked with Clover Smith, Diva's mother, to create a summer camp that would allow Diva's spirit to live on. During this five-week retreat, African-American girls, ages 11–15, engage in fun camp activities, such as cooking, sewing, dancing, and swimming. Through these activities, the campers learn important social skills that equip and develop the characteristics of a true woman. Throughout the past years, Camp Diva has been able to offer specialized before and after school programs in which the young girls are introduced to the ideas of entrepreneurship, career opportunities, and practical life skills. In order for Camp Diva to stay affordable or free for these lower-income families, Camp Diva raises their financial support through hosting fundraisers and events.

Father-Daughter Dance In Prison 
In 2007, Camp Diva hosted their first annual father-daughter dance. The purpose of this event was to establish how crucial a father-daughter relationship is to the development of a girl entering into womanhood. As the dance attendance grew each year, Patton realized that there was still a significant number of girls who could not participate at the "Date with Dad Dance" because their fathers were in prison.  Therefore, Patton and the young girls took it upon themselves to write to the Richmond City Jail for permission to host their own father-daughter dance within the walls of the jail. The Richmond City Jail agreed to hosting the dance, realizing that good family connection encourages inmates to turn their life around. In order to attending the dance, the inmates were required to take a 30-hour parenting class. On March 17, 2013, 16 inmates and 18 girls attended the first annual father-daughter dance—in jail. This event became nationally recognized after being featured in a Washington Post article and the release of Patton's TED talk. While Camp Diva continues to host their annual father-daughter dance at the Richmond City Jail, other prisons, such as Miami's Federal Detention Center and the Omaha Correctional Center, have started their very own father-daughter dance for young girls with incarcerated fathers.

Awards and recognition 

Patton's work for her community has not gone unnoticed. Patton has been awarded the title of "Virginians Making a Difference" and "The Cultural and Leadership Award". Patton received these titles of recognition because of her non-profit work in the Richmond Metropolitan area. After Patton's TED talk was released and featured on NPR, ABC World News, and Inside Edition, her mission and vision became recognizable across the nation. So much so, that in 2016 Patton was nominated and awarded by President Obama as a "Champion of Change for Enrichment for Marginalized Girls”. This title was given to ten individuals who work to improve and empower the lives of marginalized girls through extracurricular and after-school programs.

Several foundations have committed to helping GFAC financially. For example, in 2003, Girls For A Change received a three-year grant by the Draper Richards Foundation. This grant helped GFAC establish and launch programs and activities within the organization. In 2014, GFAC also received a generous grant from the Allianz Foundation.

References

External links 
Girls For A Change/Camp Diva website

Living people
Year of birth missing (living people)
Place of birth missing (living people)
American nonprofit executives
American women chief executives
Activists from Virginia
People from Richmond, Virginia
African-American activists
21st-century African-American people
21st-century African-American women
Virginia Commonwealth University alumni